Lawrenceburg is a home rule-class city in Anderson County, Kentucky, United States. The population was 10,505 at the 2010 census. It is the seat of its county. Lawrenceburg is part of the Frankfort, Kentucky, micropolitan statistical area.

History
The site of Lawrenceburg was settled in the early 1780s by a German immigrant named Jacob Kaufman and was first called Kaufman's or Coffman's Station. The post office was established as Lawrenceburgh on January 22, 1817, for William Lawrence, a local tavern owner. The community was incorporated as Lawrence in 1820 by the Court of Franklin County (of which it was then a part) but renamed Lawrenceburg in 1827. James Lawrence, a naval officer, is the namesake.

The city was formally incorporated by the state assembly in 1850.

The Four Roses distillery in Lawrenceburg was founded in 1888 and the physical distillery was built in 1910 in Spanish Mission-style architecture, and it is listed on the National Register of Historic Places. The Wild Turkey bourbon distillery is also located in Lawrenceburg.

Geography

Demographics

As of the census of 2010, there were 10,505 people, 4,194 households, and 2,882 families residing in the city. The racial makeup of the city was 93.3% White, 3.2% African American, 0.2% Native American, 0.8% Asian, 0.0% Pacific Islander, 0.9% from other races, and 1.5% from two or more races. Hispanics or Latinos of any race were 1.9% of the population.

There were 4,194 households, out of which 34.9% had children under the age of 18 living with them, 47.7% were married couples living together, 15.7% had a female householder with no husband present, and 31.3% were non-families. 26.3% of all households were made up of individuals living alone, and 10.0% had someone living alone who was 65 years of age or older. The average household size was 2.48 and the average family size was 2.96.

The age distribution was 26.7% under 18, 5.7% from 20 to 24, 29.9% from 25 to 44, 23.3% from 45 to 64, and 12.1% who were 65 or older. The median age was 35.2 years. For every 100 females, there were 88.2 males. For every 100 females age 18 and over, there were 82.6 males.

The median income for a household in the city was $44,778, and the median income for a family was $58,582. Males had a median income of $38,040 versus $35,184 for females. The per capita income for the city was $21,427. About 9.1% of families and 13.5% of the population were below the poverty line, including 23.2% of those under age 18 and 8.5% of those age 65 or over.

Education

Primary schools
 Early Childhood Center
 Emma B. Ward Elementary School
 Robert B. Turner Elementary School
 Saffell Street Elementary School
 Christian Academy of Lawrenceburg (private)
 Creative Minds Academy (private)

Secondary schools
 Anderson County Middle School
 Anderson County High School
 Christian Academy of Lawrenceburg (private)
 Harvest Christian School (private)

Colleges
 Bluegrass Community and Technical College

Public library
Lawrenceburg has a lending library, the Anderson Public Library.

Notable people
Sean Baker, a military policeman who was injured during training at Guantanamo—without his military superiors being held accountable.
James Beauchamp Clark, Speaker of the United States House of Representatives from 1911 to 1919.
 Nelson Chittum, former MLB pitcher
Anna Mac Clarke, first black Women's Army Auxiliary Corps assigned to duty with an all-white company as platoon commander (4th Co., 3rd Regt.).
Andrew McKee, submarine pioneer.

See also
Confederate Monument in Lawrenceburg
The Anderson News
The Flim-Flam Man

References

External links

City of Lawrenceburg, Kentucky

Cities in Anderson County, Kentucky
Cities in Kentucky
County seats in Kentucky
Frankfort, Kentucky micropolitan area